Drumharsna Castle is a tower house near Ardrahan, County Galway, in Ireland.

History
This castle is known to have been owned by Shane Ballagh in 1577 and was probably built some time before that. The castle was damaged when it was occupied in 1920 by the  Auxiliary Division of the Royal Irish Constabulary (ADRIC) from Galway's D company stationed at Lenaboy house.

The castle was witness to the torture and murder of two brothers, Patrick and Harry Loughnane, who were arrested by the Auxiliaries on 26 November 1920. Pat was an officer in Beagh Company of the IRA and Harry was the secretary of the Sinn Féin cumman. The prisoners were taken to Drumharsna Castle, and their badly mutilated and burnt bodies were found dumped in a nearby pond over a week later.

References

Castles in County Galway
Ruins in the Republic of Ireland
National Monuments in County Galway